Revere Public Schools (RPS) is a school district headquartered in Revere, Massachusetts.

History

In February 1945 the district created its Department of Audio-Visual Aids.

In a five year period from 1993 to 1998, enrollment increased by 25% in the district's elementary schools. Around 1998 the district had passed a roof repair and asbestos referendum worth $2.2 million. Three schools had their roofs repaired. The same referendum also funded the installation of a new fire alarm system at Revere High School.

In 2001 the school district began a $83.5 million construction program to build four new school buildings, which together were to house five schools.

By 2005, the Massachusetts Legislature approved the request of the Revere school system to use June 17, Bunker Hill Day, as a day of school instruction.

In 2009 groups of parents objected to a Massachusetts General Hospital-operated clinic at Revere High School that provided contraception services. The parents started a petition to have a November 3, 2009, bill to eliminate these services. The voters in the city ultimately did not approve of the vote for removing the contraception services.

In 2014 an increase in the number of immigrants occurred district-wide, and the high school now has a program for new immigrants.

Schools
High schools:
 Revere High School

Middle schools: All have uniforms. 
 Susan B. Anthony School for the Arts
This school is connected to the Whelan Elementary school.
 Garfield Middle School
 Rumney Marsh Academy

Elementary schools: All have uniforms. 
 Beachmont Veterans Memorial Elementary School
 Abraham Lincoln Elementary School
 Staff Sergeant James J. Hill Elementary School
 Paul Revere Elementary School
 A. C. Whelan Elementary School
The Massachusetts State Government was originally scheduled to reimburse the Revere city government for 90% of the costs for the construction of what is the current Whelan school. In 2001 the Whelan project was put on the School Building Assistance program list. However the state delayed giving the funds. The Revere government waited for a three year period to acquire the funds. In February 2004, all of the members of the City of Revere City Council voted to have the current school campus built. Construction was scheduled to begin in June 2004. At that time the state government had not given the funds to the municipality.
Alternative schools:
 SeaCoast School

References
Mulligan, Paul Vincent. "Audio-visual Education in the Revere Public Schools" (Service Paper, Master's of Education thesis) (Archive). Boston University, 1946. - See entry at OpenBU, See entry at Google Books

Notes

Further reading
"REVERE'S SCHOOL UNION SAYS IT'S NOT TO BLAME" Boston Globe; (Mar 27, 2005), p. 7: "Once again, the superintendent of the Revere public schools has attempted to direct blame toward the members of AFSCME Local 1383, which represents custodians, maintenance workers, cafeteria workers, clerks and secretaries, and bus drivers, for the situation which exists concerning school being in session on certain Suffolk County holidays."

External links

 Revere Public Schools

School districts in Massachusetts
Schools in Suffolk County, Massachusetts
Revere, Massachusetts